Chachmei Lublin Yeshiva ("Academy of the Sages of Lublin") was a Jewish educational institution (yeshiva) that operated in the city of Lublin, Poland from 1930 to 1939. At the time, it was one of the largest in the world.

History

On May 22–28, 1924, the cornerstone laying ceremony took place for the construction of the yeshiva building. Approximately 50,000 people participated in the event.

The opening ceremony took place on June 24–25, 1930. Apart from thousands of local Jews, around 10,000 people arrived from all over Poland and abroad.

When the German Army took Lublin during World War II, they stripped the interior and burned the vast library in the town square. An officer who witnessed the event reported that a brass band played while a Jewish throng loudly wept as the books burned. The building became the regional headquarters of the German Military Police. After the war, in the autumn of 1945, the property was taken over by the state as an abandoned possession and assigned to the newly established Maria Curie-Skłodowska University. It was used by the Medical University of Lublin.

In the 1964, Yeshiva Chachmei Lublin of Detroit was reimbursed for the building, receiving $177,042.25.

In 2003 the building was returned to the Jewish community. Its synagogue, the first to be entirely renovated by the Jewish community of Poland since World War II, was reopened on February 11, 2007.

As of October 2013, a four-star hotel named Hotel Ilan was opened in the building.

During the 2022 Russian invasion of Ukraine, the building was converted by the American Jewish Joint Distribution Committee into a refugee camp for roughly 190 Ukrainian Jewish refugees, including an educational center for refugee children operated by alumni of HaMahanot HaOlim youth group.

Reputation
In order to pass the entrance exams for the yeshiva, candidates had to meet very high standards both in terms of knowledge (memorizing 400 pages from the Talmud) and moral conduct. The youngest candidates could attend a preparatory course called Mechina. The students were divided into two age groups: younger (14–17 years) and older (from 17 years upward). The course of study lasted four years. The curriculum encompassed exclusively studies of the Talmud, its codifications and commentaries. The core of everyday instruction was memorizing the daily folio of the Talmud, and then studying pertinent commentaries by scholars from the medieval and modern period. Four times a week, the rector offered a 3-hour-long lecture presenting the methods of interpretation of Talmudic issues. During these lectures discussion was allowed. At the end of every semester, each student was examined by the rosh yeshiva on his newly acquired knowledge. More talented students gained additional knowledge necessary to perform the function of a rabbi.

Legacy

Chachmei Lublin of Detroit
A yeshiva named Chachmei Lublin was established in Detroit Michigan by Rabbi Moshe Rothenberg in the 1940s. Rothenberg had been a student of Rabbi Meir Shapiro in the original Chachmei Lublin yeshiva. The yeshiva thrived for over a decade before it closed.

Chachmei Lublin of Bnei Brak
A yeshiva named Chachmei was established in Bnei Brak by Rabbi Shmuel Wosner who was a student of the original yeshiva in Lublin.

Notable alumni
Rabbi Yehuda Meir Abramowicz
Rabbi Abraham Mordechay Hershberg, Chief Rabbi of Mexico
Rabbi Pinchas Hirschprung
Rabbi Chaim Kreiswirth
Rabbi Yisroel Moshe Olewski
Rabbi Yonah Sztencl
Rabbi Shmuel Wosner

Recent Events
With the closure of the Chachmei Lublin Yeshiva by the Nazis and the conversion of the yeshiva to a medical academy, the Siyum HaShas was not held in its original venue for many cycles. In 1998 the yeshiva was returned to the Jewish community of Warsaw, which undertook renovations. In March 2005, Rabbi David Singer, an Orthodox Jew from Brooklyn, New York, whose father, Rabbi Joseph Singer, the Pilzno Rav, had been born in Poland, organized the 11th Siyum HaShas in the Chachmei Lublin Yeshiva. Chaired by Rabbi Baruch Taub, rabbi emeritus of Beth Avraham Yoseph of Toronto, the event was linked by satellite to the one in New York and was attended by over 200 participants, including the Rebbes of Sadigura, Modzhitz, Nadvorna, and Biala; Rabbi Yona Metzger, Chief Rabbi of Israel, and Israeli politician Rabbi Menachem Porush.

Singer organized the 12th Siyum HaShas at the Chachmei Lublin Yeshiva on 1 August 2012. Participants viewed a simultaneous broadcast from the event taking place that same day at the MetLife Stadium in New Jersey.

In January 2020, the 13th Siyum HaShas was again held in the yeshiva building.

See also
Synagogue in Chachmei Lublin Yeshiva

References

External links
Lublin Yeshiva 
Zydowski Lublin: History of the Yeshiva, Andrzej Trzciński
Polish Jews to reopen synagogue in prewar yeshiva Chachmei Lublin, Haaretz, February 11, 2007

Orthodox yeshivas in Europe
Educational institutions established in 1930
Buildings and structures in Lublin
Holocaust locations in Poland
Pre-World War II European yeshivas
Yeshivas of Poland
Orthodox Judaism in Poland
1930 establishments in Poland